Radio 1's Weekend Breakfast Show is a radio show that is broadcast on BBC Radio 1 on weekends. It is currently hosted by Adele Roberts, who took over since January 2021.

Weekend Breakfast was an extension of Radio 1 Breakfast which, before June 2018, aired on weekdays from 6:30 to 10am, while the weekend show aired on Saturdays and Sundays. In June 2018 Radio 1 decided to incorporate the Friday breakfast show into the station's weekend schedule, using the weekend presenters. In November 2020, the BBC announced changes to the Radio 1 schedules, meaning Matt Edmondson and Mollie King would move from weekend breakfast to weekend afternoons to replace Dev, who left the station in December 2020, and that the weekend breakfast show would only be broadcast on weekends. As of January 2021, they started airing on Fridays as Greg James now does five days a week.

History 
Weekend breakfast programming on Radio 1 had originally been a continuation of Junior Choice with Ed Stewart and later Tony Blackburn which had been broadcast on the BBC Light Programme (originally as Children's Favourites) since 1954. This ended in September 1984 when a new weekend breakfast show, minus the children's requests, was launched with Peter Powell being the first presenter followed by, among others, Mark Goodier, Sybil Ruscoe, Bruno Brookes and Liz Kershaw together, Gary Davies, Kevin Greening, Clive Warren and Dave Pearce. In the late 1990s and early 2000s, the weekend breakfast show was split into two different shows by two different DJs until on 20 September 2003, the separate weekend breakfast shows were merged.

Notes

Dev and Alice Levine (March - November 2018) 
On 17 January 2018, BBC Radio 1 announced that Alice Levine would be shifted from the weekend afternoon slot (1-4pm) to co-host Dev on the Weekend Breakfast slot. At a time when pay equality is under scrutiny at the BBC, Radio 1 confirmed Alice Levine and Dev would earn the same, as will Maya and Jordan. Matt Edmondson filled Alice Levine's afternoon slot. The show was then increased to three days (Friday to Sundays) as the weekend schedule was incorporated into Friday's schedule.

Matt Edmondson and Mollie King (November 2018 - January 2021) 
On 26 October 2018, BBC Radio 1 announced that Matt Edmondson and Mollie King would join the Radio 1's Weekend Breakfast Show, swapping with Dev and Alice Levine which shifted to the afternoon slot at 1-4pm. The schedule change may have been sparked by Charlie Sloth's unexpectedly early departure from Radio 1 in October 2018. As a result, Dev has been covering Charlie Sloth's evening show, namely The 8th. According to Radio 1's website, he will continue to do for the foreseeable future. If he had stayed on breakfast, this would have meant a late-night finish for Dev on Thursdays, followed by an early-morning start on Fridays. The changes took into place on 16 November 2018. The first song of the show was Higher from The Saturdays and Flo Rida, as they called Greg James (Radio 1 Breakfast presenter) to pick it.

Show Length 
At the beginning, the show had a length of 3 hours, which was from 7-10am. Beginning from September 2014, the show was then increased to 4 hours (6-10am) due to changes on the late night and early morning schedule.

From 5 September 2019, another shake up happened to the early morning schedule. Arielle Free hosts the weekend early breakfast slot, and Mollie King hosts a new show called "Radio 1's Best New Pop with Mollie King" on Friday 6-6:30 am. This results in the show reducing to 3 hours 30 minutes (6:30 - 10am) for Fridays; and 3 hours (7-10am) for Saturdays and Sundays.

Due to the COVID-19 pandemic, the show was adjusted to 7-11am, inclusive of Radio 1 Anthems at the final hour of the show. The adjustment was to help Radio 1 promote social distancing and to limit the number of staff allowed in the studio. The show is then moved to 7-10:30am in the September 2020 adjustments.

References

BBC Radio 1 programmes
British radio breakfast shows
British music radio programmes